A neutron research facility is most commonly a big laboratory operating a large-scale neutron source that provides thermal neutrons to a suite of research instruments. The neutron source usually is a research reactor or a spallation source. In some cases, a smaller facility will provide high energy neutrons (e.g. 2.5 MeV or 14 MeV fusion neutrons) using existing neutron generator technologies.

List of neutron facilities 

The following list is intended to be exhaustive and to cover active facilities as well as those that are shut down.

Australia
 ANSTO-HIFAR Reactor, Sydney
 Open-pool Australian lightwater reactor (OPAL)

Bangladesh
 Atomic Energy Research Establishment (AERE), Bangladesh Atomic Energy Commission(BAEC)

Canada
 NRC Canadian Neutron Beam Centre at Chalk River Laboratories
 RE-Labs Inc. – Single Event Effects Testing Services

China
 China Spallation Neutron Source – Dongguan, Guangdong.
 CNPG – Light ion (D,T), China Institute of Atomic Energy
 HI-13 – Light ion (D,T), China Institute of Atomic Energy

Czech Republic
 Neutron Physics Laboratory (within CANAM infrastructure)

Denmark
 Risø (reactors 1958–2000)

Egypt
 ETRR-1 – Nuclear Research Center, Inshas (1961–)
 ETRR-2 – Nuclear Research Center, Inshas (1997–)

France
 ILL – Institut Laue–Langevin (1972–) 
 LLB – Laboratoire Léon Brillouin at CEA Saclay
 NFS – GANIL

Germany
 FRM I – Technical University, Garching (1957–2000)
 FRM II – Technical University, Garching (2004–)
 FRMZ –Johannes Gutenberg-Universität, Mainz (1967–)
 FRJ-2 at Forschungszentrum Jülich (1962–2006)
 Jülich Centre for Neutron Science (2005–), a virtual facility that operates instruments at other facilities (FRM II, ILL, SNS) 
 FRG-1 – GKSS, Geesthacht near Hamburg (1958–2010)
 Helmholtz-Zentrum Berlin, formerly HMI – Hahn-Meitner-Institut

Hungary
 KFKI Research Institutes, Budapest

India
 Dhruva, CIRUS and Apsara: Bhabha Atomic Research Centre, Mumbai
 KAMINI

Indonesia
 Neutron Scattering Laboratory –  (BATAN)

Japan
 JAERI – Japan Atomic Energy Research Institute
 KENS – High Energy Accelerator Organisation, KEK
 KURRI – Research Reactor Institute (Kyoto)
 JSNS – (part of the Japan proton accelerator research complex (J-PARC)

Netherlands
 IRI – Interfaculty Reactor Institute, Delft University of Technology

Norway
 IFE – Jeep 2 reactor at Kjeller Institute for Energy Technology

Poland
 Maria reactor – POLATOM Institute of Nuclear Energy, Świerk-Otwock
 Ewa reactor – POLATOM Institute of Nuclear Energy, Świerk-Otwock (1958–1995)

Russia
 IBR Fast Pulsed Reactors (Dubna)
 JINR – Joint Institute for Nuclear Research, Dubna
 Gatchina

South Africa
 NECSA SAFARI-1

South Korea
 High-Flux Advanced Neutron Application Reactor (HANARO) – Korea Atomic Energy Research Institute (KAERI)

Sweden
 NFL – Studsvik Neutron Research Laboratory, Studsvik
 ESS – European Spallation Source (project)

Switzerland
 SINQ@PSI – Paul Scherrer Institute
 UCN@PSI – Paul Scherrer Institute – Ultra Cold Neutron Source
 n_TOF – CERN

Ukraine
 

United Kingdom
 DIDO
 ISIS Neutron and Muon Source, Rutherford Appleton Laboratory, Oxfordshire

United States
 HFBR – High Flux Beam Reactor, Brookhaven (1965–1996)
 IPNS – Intense Pulsed Neutron Source, Argonne National Laboratory (1981–2008)
 LANSCE – Los Alamos Neutron Science Center (Los Alamos)
 LENS – Low Energy Neutron Source, Indiana University, Bloomington, IN.
 NIST – Center for Neutron Research, Gaithersburg near Washington D.C.
 NSL – Neutron Science Laboratory, University of Michigan College of Engineering.
 HFIR – High Flux Isotope Reactor, Oak Ridge National Laboratory
 SNS – Spallation Neutron Source, Oak Ridge National Laboratory
 MURR – University of Missouri Research Reactor, Columbia, MO.
 MNRC – MacClellan Nuclear Research Center, Sacramento, CA.

References

External links
 List of major active neutron facilities
 NMI3 – a European consortium of 18 partner organisations from 12 countries, including all major facilities in the fields of neutron scattering and muon spectroscopy

Nuclear physics